Yarim District is a district of the Ibb Governorate, Yemen. As of 2003, the district had a population of 175,014 inhabitants.

Uzal (sub-districts) of Yarim 
There are 11 ʽUzal (sub-districts) in Yarim.

 Yarim
 Khaw
 Raʽin
 ʽUbaydah
 ʽOras
 Bani Omar
 bani Saba'
 Bani Muslim
 Khudan
 Bani Munabah
 Aryab

References

Districts of Ibb Governorate
Yarim District